Highland Township, Ohio, may refer to:

Highland Township, Defiance County, Ohio
Highland Township, Muskingum County, Ohio

Ohio township disambiguation pages